KBOA may refer to:

 KBOA (AM), a radio station (1540 AM) licensed to Kennett, Missouri, United States
 KBOA-FM, a radio station (105.5 FM) licensed to Piggott, Arkansas, United States